Kouré is a rural community located  east of Niamey, the capital of Niger. The town lies on both sides of the road from Niamey to Dallol Bosso.

Kouré is best known for West African giraffes (Giraffa camelopardalis peralta), an endemic subspecies of West Africa.
The population of giraffes in Niger reached a low of 50 animals 1984, but according to the Association to Safeguard Giraffes in Niger (ASGN) there are now 170 of them. ASGN and its partners have assisted the local community with bore holes, cereal banks, grain mills, seeds and fertilizer to encourage them to protect the giraffes, which can be destructive to crops. However, the population of giraffes is threatened by loss of the tiger bush habitat, which is gradually being cleared for agriculture.

The African Wildlife Foundation is helping with reforestation.
In August 2010, a tree nursery in Kouré produced about 3,500 seedlings. AWF planned to establish another nursery in the area in 2011.

In July 2011 the Association des Scouts du Niger ran an international solidarity camp at Kouré. 
About 300 young people aged 18 to 25 years from various countries attended. 
The theme was promoting youth participation in development through a culture of peace, tolerance and nonviolence.

A mass shooting occurred here in 2020.

Gallery

References

Populated places in Niger
Tillabéri Region